The Doha Diamond League is an annual one-day track and field meeting held at the Suheim bin Hamad Stadium in Doha, Qatar. It is part of the Diamond League – the top level international circuit for the sport. It is typically held in May as the first leg of the Diamond League series. 

It was first organized in 1997 as the Doha Grand Prix as a men's only programme before adding women's events the following year. The competition gained IAAF Grand Prix II status for its second edition in 1998, then Grand Prix I status in 1999, and became one of the five IAAF Super Grand Prix events in 2004. The name of the meeting has frequently changed to match the athletics series of which it is a part. The meeting was not held in 2000 (with the stadium holding the 2000 IAAF Grand Prix Final instead) and no meeting was held in Doha in 2003. The 2019 edition moved to Khalifa International Stadium. The 2020 edition will be spread across two days. The high jump will take place at the Katara Amphitheatre on 16 April 2020 while the main programme will return to the Qatar Sports Club on 17 April 2020.

Editions

Events
Since the establishment of the Doha Meeting, there have been changes in the event programme every year compared to the previous year. The two diagrams below indicate which events took place each year.

Meeting records

Men

Women

References

External links
 Diamond League - Doha Official Web Site
 Past winners
 Qatar Athletic Super Grand Prix Records

 
Diamond League
IAAF Super Grand Prix
IAAF Grand Prix
Sports competitions in Doha
Athletics competitions in Qatar
Recurring sporting events established in 1997
1997 establishments in Qatar
May sporting events
IAAF World Outdoor Meetings